Samang (also known as Samangan) is a village in Dadenjan Rural District, Meymand District, Firuzabad County, Fars Province, Iran. At the 2006 census, its population was 105, in 21 families.

References 

Populated places in Firuzabad County